Cartersburg Springs (or Magnetic Springs) is a site in Liberty Township, Hendricks County, Indiana, about a mile north of the town of Carterburg. The springs formerly at the site have ceased flowing,

Geography

History

The springs were known by and used extensively by Native Americans in the area well before the first white settler, Samuel McCormick and his wife arrived about 1800. Native American artifacts such as arrowheads, and beads, were periodically found near the springs as recently as the 1950s.

Samuel and his wife settled on the hill overlooking the springs near what is now Cartersburg, Indiana, and raised 12 children. According to a 1926 recorded interview with daughter Eliza Jane McCormick, no one in the family ever required the care of a doctor. The family attributed their good health to the healing powers of the spring water.

By the mid-19th century residents of the area would regularly visit the springs to bathe and take home containers of this miracle water.

In 1822, George Matlock, Jacob Wagoner, William Ballard, and Alen Little purchased the farm that surrounded the springs. By the late 19th century the springs had become so popular for picnics and social gatherings that A.W. Carter, G.V. Seaton, J.A. Veatch, John Tartelon, Edward Conn, T.A. Prewitt, and J.A. Dobyn formed the Cartersburg Springs Mineral Corporation with the intent of selling shares and building a resort.

A post in the Danville Union newspaper dated Feb. 19, 1874 states: 

Almost immediately disagreements and disputes erupted, some leading to bitter grudges.

By 1900, the group had spent a tidy sum of money that they didn't have, and they were forced to sell some of the land. One of the stockholders, Albert Veatch, purchased about  including the hill overlooking the springs with the intent of building a competing hotel but that dream never materialized.

An advertisement titled "The Season of 1901" promoted the springs by saying, 

Brochure prices were:
 Weekly board $7.00/$8.00
 Daily board $1.50
 Single meals $0.40
 Bath with attendant $0.50

Around 1903 the balance of the Cartersburg Springs Mineral Corporation was purchased by Dr. Kimberlin, a well-known heart specialist. He immediately sold a 49% interest to Armand Koehne and together they pushed the enterprise into a summer hotel success.

A 1903 water analysis report released by the Indiana State Board of Health and signed by the boards director Dr. J.N. Hurty says:

By the summer of 1904, with Lee Allison as the hotel proprietor, wealthy people began sending their children, nannies, and nurse-maids to the hotel for the entire summer with the parents joining them on weekends. Every room of the hotel was filled from June through August, and in 1905 and again in 1906, advanced reservations ensured that every room would be occupied the following summer. Besides the springs, there was a dance hall, bowling alley, race track, and picnic grounds in and around the resort. The hotel was doing quite well and the area was thriving.

After the hotel closed for the season in 1906, Mr. Allison moved his belongings to a hill house and began making plans for new additions to be built and available by next season. In the middle of a beautiful fall night fire broke out at the rear of the hotel and spread via a board walk to the bath house. People from all around arrived in an attempt to save the structures, but all was a total loss. Neither the hotel or bath house were rebuilt, some say because the two partners couldn't agree on what type of new facility should be built. Rumor is that Dr. Kimberlin wanted it to be a clean, wholesome, Christian place, while Mr. Koehne preferred a more "free and easy" life style. Rumors also suggested that the hotel's insurance premium was due the next day and that a container of oil soaked rags were found near what was thought to be the fires source - however arson was never proven.

Despite the demise of the resort, the springs eventually returned as a source of income for Cartersburg-Crystal Springs Inc. as a source of its bottled water. A collection plant was built at the springs and water was trucked to Indianapolis for processing and bottling. Cartersburg-Crystal Spring water was available at many of Indianapolis's finest hotels and restaurants as well as for home delivery.

Cartersburg-Crystal Springs Inc. was located at 955 Fort Wayne Avenue, Indianapolis, Indiana for over 50 years.

The collection plant at the springs has been incorporated into a residence, but the original structure remains visible to this day.

References

External links
 Mill Creek Community Historical Society

Bodies of water of Hendricks County, Indiana
Springs of Indiana